"D.P.M.O" (acronym for Don't Piss Me Off) is a song by British rapper Professor Green, from his second studio album At Your Inconvenience. A remix featuring French rapper Orelsan was released in France as a promotional single on 24 February 2012.

Track listing

Chart performance

Release history

References

2011 songs
Professor Green songs
Orelsan songs
Songs written by Professor Green